Dzneladze is a Georgian surname. Notable people with the surname include:

Giorgi Dzneladze (born 1968), retired Georgian professional football player
Irakli Dzneladze (born 1968), Georgian Brigadier general
Roman Dzneladze (1933–1966), Soviet olympic wrestler
Zurab Dzneladze (born 1994), Georgian rugby union player

Surnames of Georgian origin
Georgian-language surnames